Riot City Blues is the eighth studio album by Scottish rock band Primal Scream, released on 5 June 2006 by Columbia Records. It peaked at number 5 on the UK Albums Chart. With this album, the band left behind the electronic elements they had used on their previous albums XTRMNTR (2000) and Evil Heat (2003), returning to more traditional rock and roll. The album features guest appearances from Will Sergeant, Warren Ellis, and Alison Mosshart, and was the last album to feature guitarist Robert "Throb" Young, who departed before the album's UK tour for personal reasons.

The album's first single "Country Girl" became the band's highest charting in their career. "Dolls (Sweet Rock and Roll)" and "Sometimes I Feel So Lonely" were also released as singles.

Critical reception

At Metacritic, which assigns a weighted average score out of 100 to reviews from mainstream critics, the album received an average score of 59, based on 19 reviews, indicating "mixed or average reviews".

The album was released to varying reviews. A particularly scathing review by Pitchfork claimed that the album was "flat and dead. It's as if Primal Scream have run completely out of ideas and so they've reverted to the detestable fallbacks of honking harmonicas and bar-band choogles, acting like college freshmen who just discovered blues." While The Guardian said "...Primal Scream are the kind of band that would probably snap there's no such thing as a guilty pleasure, only good music and bad music. But their eighth album undermines that claim. On the one hand, it is conservatism dressed up as rebellion, derivative, self-parodic and very, very, stupid. On the other, it boasts an energy and a shamelessness that demands you abandon your vast array of reservations. No mean feat."

Riot City Blues was listed among the ten worst Scottish albums ever made in a 2007 online poll of music fans.

Track listing

Personnel
Credits adapted from liner notes.
Primal Scream
 Bobby Gillespie – vocals
 Andrew Innes – guitar, mandolin, banjo, synthesizer
 Martin Duffy – piano, organ, harmonium, harmonica
 Robert Young – guitars, harmonica
 Gary "Mani" Mounfield – bass guitar
 Darrin Mooney – drums, percussion
Additional musicians
 Alison Mosshart – additional vocals (3, 8)
 Will Sergeant – guitar (4, 5)
 Chris Allen – hurdy-gurdy (5)
 Warren Ellis – violin (9)
 Juliet Roberts – backing vocals (1, 2, 5, 10)
 Sharlene Hector – backing vocals (1, 2, 5, 10)
 Sylvia Mason-James – backing vocals (1, 2, 5, 10)
 John Gibbons – backing vocals (1, 2, 5, 10)
 Richard Beale – French horn (10)
Tim Bran - programming
Technical
Ryan Castle, Greg Gordon - engineer
Clive Goddard - recording

Charts

Weekly charts

Year-end charts

References

External links
 

2006 albums
Primal Scream albums
Albums produced by Youth (musician)
Columbia Records albums
albums recorded at Olympic Sound Studios